The 2015–16 Hong Kong Third Division League is the 2nd season of Hong Kong Third Division League since it became the fourth-tier football league in Hong Kong in 2014–15.

The league started on 6 September 2015 and ended on 22 May 2016.

Teams

Changes from last season

From Third Division League
Promoted to Second Division League
 Tung Sing

Eliminated from league
 Lung Moon

To Third Division League
Relegated from Second Division League
 New Fair Kui Tan

Joined league
 Sun International
 HKFYG
 Hoi King

League table

Results

References

Hong Kong Third Division League seasons